The 37th annual Toronto International Film Festival (TIFF) was held in Toronto, Ontario, Canada between September 6 and September 16, 2012. TIFF announced the films that were accepted on August 21, 2012. On its 37th edition the TIFF included a 289 feature films and 83 short films. Directed by Rian Johnson, Looper  was selected as the opening film.

Awards

On 17 September 2012, it was announced that David O. Russell's comedy film, Silver Linings Playbook, had been awarded the People's Choice Award. The film, in which Bradley Cooper and Jennifer Lawrence appear as "neurotic lovers obsessed with their exes", is based on a novel by Matthew Quick. The festival director, Piers Handling, stated that the film is "a deeply emotional story." Ben Affleck's Argo was the runner-up for the prize. Jared Leto's Artifact was given the People's Choice Award for best documentary, while Martin McDonagh's Seven Psychopaths won the Midnight Madness audience award.

Programmes

Gala Presentations
Argo by Ben Affleck
The Company You Keep by Robert Redford
Dangerous Liaisons by Hur Jin-ho
Emperor by Peter Webber
English Vinglish by Gauri Shinde
Free Angela & All Political Prisoners by Shola Lynch
Great Expectations by Mike Newell
Hyde Park on Hudson by Roger Michell
Inescapable by Ruba Nadda
Jayne Mansfield's Car by Billy Bob Thornton
Looper by Rian Johnson
Love, Marilyn by Liz Garbus
Midnight's Children by Deepa Mehta
The Reluctant Fundamentalist by Mira Nair
A Royal Affair by Nikolaj Arcel
Silver Linings Playbook by David O. Russell
Song for Marion by Paul Andrew Williams
Thermae Romae by Hideki Takeuchi
Twice Born by Sergio Castellitto
What Maisie Knew by Scott McGehee and David Siegel

Special Presentations
Anna Karenina by Joe Wright
Antiviral by Brandon Cronenberg
Arthur Newman by Dante Ariola
At Any Price by Ramin Bahrani
The Attack by Ziad Doueiri
Bad 25 by Spike Lee
Byzantium by Neil Jordan
Capital by Costa-Gavras
Cloud Atlas by Tom Tykwer, Andy Wachowski and Lana Wachowski
The Deep by Baltasar Kormákur
Disconnect by Henry Alex Rubin
Do Not Disturb by Yvan Attal
Dormant Beauty by Marco Bellocchio
Dreams for Sale by Nishikawa Miwa
End of Watch by David Ayer
Everybody Has A Plan by Ana Piterbarg
Foxfire by Laurent Cantet
Frances Ha by Noah Baumbach
Ginger & Rosa by Sally Potter
Greetings from Tim Buckley by Dan Algrant
Hannah Arendt by Margarethe von Trotta
The Hunt by Thomas Vinterberg
The Iceman by Ariel Vromen
Imogene by Robert Pulcini and Shari Springer Berman
The Impossible by J.A. Bayona
In the House by François Ozon
Inch'Allah by Anaïs Barbeau-Lavalette
Kon-Tiki by Joachim Rønning and Espen Sandberg
The Last Supper by Lu Chuan
A Late Quartet by Yaron Zilberman
Laurence Anyways by Xavier Dolan
A Liar's Autobiography — The Untrue Story of Monty Python's Graham Chapman by Ben Timlett
Lines of Wellington by Valeria Sarmiento
Liverpool by Manon Briand
Lore by Cate Shortland
Love is All You Need by Susanne Bier
The Master by Paul Thomas Anderson
Mr. Pip by Andrew Adamson
Much Ado About Nothing by Joss Whedon
No by Pablo Larraín
On The Road by Walter Salles
Outrage Beyond by Takeshi Kitano
The Paperboy by Lee Daniels
Passion by Brian De Palma
The Perks of Being a Wallflower by Stephen Chbosky
The Place Beyond the Pines by Derek Cianfrance
Quartet by Dustin Hoffman
Reality by Matteo Garrone
War Witch (Rebelle) by Kim Nguyen
Rhino Season by Bahman Ghobadi
Rust and Bone by Jacques Audiard
The Sapphires by Wayne Blair
The Sessions by Ben Lewin
The Son Did It by Daniele Ciprì
Spring Breakers by Harmony Korine
Still by Michael McGowan
Stories We Tell by Sarah Polley
The Suicide Shop by Patrice Leconte
Tai Chi by Stephen Fung
Thanks for Sharing by Stuart Blumberg
Thérèse Desqueyroux by Claude Miller
The Time Being by Nenad Cicin-Sain
To the Wonder by Terrence Malick
Venus and Serena by Maiken Baird
White Elephant by Pablo Trapero
Writers by Josh Boone
Yellow by Nick Cassavetes
Zaytoun by Eran Riklis

Documentaries
9.79* - Daniel Gordon
A World Not Ours - Mahdi Fleifel
The Act of Killing - Joshua Oppenheimer
Artifact - Bartholomew Cubbins
As if We Were Catching a Cobra - Hala Alabdalla
Camp 14–Total Control Zone - Marc Wiese
The Central Park Five - Ken Burns, David McMahon and Sarah Burns
Far Out Isn't Far Enough: The Tomi Ungerer Story - Brad Bernstein
First Comes Love - Nina Davenport
The Gatekeepers - Dror Moreh
The Girl from the South - José Luis García
How to Make Money Selling Drugs - Matthew Cooke
Iceberg Slim: Portrait of a Pimp - Jorge Hinojosa
London – The Modern Babylon - Julien Temple
Lunarcy! - Simon Ennis
Mea Maxima Culpa: Silence in the House of God - Alex Gibney
Men At Lunch - Seán Ó Cualáin
More Than Honey - Markus Imhoof
No Place on Earth - Janet Tobias
Reincarnated - Andrew Capper
Revolution - Rob Stewart
Roman Polanski: Odd Man Out - Marina Zenovich
The Secret Disco Revolution - Jamie Kastner
Shepard & Dark - Treva Wurmfeld
Show Stopper: The Theatrical Life of Garth Drabinsky - Barry Avrich
State 194 - Dan Setton
Storm Surfers 3D - Christopher Nelius and Justin McMillan
The Walls of Dakar - Abdoul Aziz Cissé

Midnight Madness
The ABCs of Death - Multiple directors
Aftershock - Nicolás López
The Bay - Barry Levinson
Come Out and Play - Makinov
Dredd - Pete Travis
Hellbenders - JT Petty
John Dies at the End - Don Coscarelli
The Lords of Salem - Rob Zombie
No One Lives - Ryuhei Kitamura
Seven Psychopaths - Martin McDonagh

Vanguard
90 Minutes - Eva Sørhaug
Beijing Flickers - Zhang Yuan
Berberian Sound Studio - Peter Strickland
Blondie - Jesper Ganslandt
Here Comes the Devil - Adrian Garcia Bogliano
I Declare War - Jason Lapeyre and Robert Wilson
iLL Manors - Ben Drew
Motorway - Soi Cheang
Painless - Juan Carlos Medina
Peaches Does Herself - Peaches
Pusher - Luis Prieto
Room 237 - Rodney Ascher
Sightseers - Ben Wheatley
Thale - Aleksander Nordaas
The We and the I - Michel Gondry

Contemporary World Cinema
3 - Pablo Stoll Ward
After the Battle - Yousry Nasrallah
All That Matters Is Past - Sara Johnsen
Baby Blues - Katarzyna Rosłaniec
Barbara - Christian Petzold
Bwakaw - Jun Robles Lana
Camion - Rafaël Ouellet
Children of Sarajevo - Aida Begic
Clandestine Childhood - Benjamín Ávila
Comrade Kim Goes Flying - Anja Daelemans
The Cowards Who Looked to the Sky - Yuki Tanada
The Cremator - Peng Tao
The Crimes of Mike Recket - Bruce Sweeney
Dead Europe - Tony Krawitz
Dust - Julio Hernández Cordón
Eagles - Dror Sabo
Fin - Jorge Torregrossa
The Fitzgerald Family Christmas - Edward Burns
Fly with the Crane - Li Ruijun
Ghost Graduation - Javier Ruiz Caldera
God Loves Caviar - Yannis Smaragdis
Gone Fishing - Carlos Sorín
The Great Kilapy - Zézé Gamboa
A Hijacking - Tobias Lindholm
Him, Here, After - Asoka Handagama
The Holy Quaternity - Jan Hřebejk
Home Again - Sudz Sutherland
Imagine - Andrzej Jakimowski
In the Fog - Sergei Loznitsa
In the Name of Love - Luu Huynh
Jackie - Antoinette Beumer
Jump - Kieron J. Walsh
Just the Wind - Bence Fliegauf
Juvenile Offender - Yikwan Kang
Key of Life - Kenji Uchida
Kinshasa Kids - Marc-Henri Wajnberg
The Land of Hope - Sion Sono
The Lesser Blessed - Anita Doron
Middle of Nowhere - Ava DuVernay
Museum Hours - Jem Cohen
My Awkward Sexual Adventure - Sean Garrity
Once Upon a Time Was I, Verônica - Marcelo Gomes
Paradise: Love - Ulrich Seidl
The Patience Stone - Atiq Rahimi
Penance - Kioshi Kurosawa
Peripeteia - John Akomfrah
Road North - Mika Kaurismäki
Shores of Hope - Toke Constantin Hebbeln
Sleeper's Wake - Barry Berk
Smashed - James Ponsoldt
The Thieves - Choi Dong-hoon
Three Kids - Jonas d'Adesky
Three Worlds - Catherine Corsini
Thy Womb - Brillante Mendoza
The Tortoise, An Incarnation - Girish Kasaravalli
Underground: The Julian Assange Story - Robert Connolly
Virgin Margarida - Licinio Azevedo
Watchtower - Pelin Esmer
A Werewolf Boy - Jo Sung-hee
What Richard Did - Lenny Abrahamson
When I Saw You - Annemarie Jacir
Zabana! - Saïd Ould-Khelifa

Masters
Amour - Michael Haneke
Beyond the Hills (Dupa Dealuri) - Cristian Mungiu
The End of Time - Peter Mettler
Everyday - Michael Winterbottom
Gebo and the Shadow (Gebo et l'ombre) - Manoel de Oliveira
In Another Country (Da-Reun Na-ra-e-suh) - Hong Sang-soo
Like Someone in Love - Abbas Kiarostami
Me and You - Bernardo Bertolucci
Night Across the Street (La Noche de Enfrente) - Raúl Ruiz
Pietà - Kim Ki-duk
Something in the Air (Après mai) - Olivier Assayas
Student - Darezhan Omirbayev
Tout ce que tu possèdes (All That You Possess) - Bernard Émond
When Day Breaks - Goran Paskaljevic

City To City: Mumbai
The Bright Day - Mohit Takalkar
Gangs of Wasseypur - Part 1 - Anurag Kashyap
Gangs of Wasseypur - Part 2 - Anurag Kashyap
Ishaqzaade - Habib Faisal
Miss Lovely - Ashim Ahluwalia
Mumbai's King - Manjeet Singh
Peddlers - Vasan Bala
Shahid - Hansal Mehta
Shanghai - Dibakar Banerjee
Ship of Theseus - Anand Gandhi

TIFF Kids
Ernest & Célestine - Benjamin Renner
Finding Nemo 3D - Andrew Stanton
Hotel Transylvania - Genndy Tartakovsky
Igor & the Cranes' Journey - Evgeny Ruman

TIFF Cinematheque
The Bitter Ash - Larry Kent
The Cloud Capped Star - Ritwik Ghatak
Dial M for Murder - Alfred Hitchcock
Loin du Viêtnam - Joris Ivens, William Klein, Claude Lelouch, Agnès Varda, Jean-Luc Godard, Chris Marker, Alain Resnais
Stromboli - Roberto Rossellini
Tess - Roman Polanski

Discovery
7 Boxes - Juan Carlos Maneglia
Augustine - Alice Winocour
Blackbird - Jason Buxton
Blancanieves - Pablo Berger
Boy Eating the Bird's Food - Ektoras Lygizos
The Brass Teapot - Ramaa Mosley
Burn It Up - Djassa Lonesome Solo
Call Girl - Mikael Marcimain
Clip - Maja Miloš
The Color of the Chameleon - Emil Christov
The Deflowering of Eva van End - Michiel ten Horn
Detroit Unleaded - Rola Nashef
Eat Sleep Die - Gabriela Pichler
Fill the Void - Rama Burshtein
The Interval - Leonardo Di Costanzo
Janeane from Des Moines - Grace Lee
Krivina - Igor Drljaca
The Land of Eb - Andrew Williamson
Mushrooming - Toomas Hussar
Nights with Theodore - Sébastien Betbeder
Our Little Differences - Sylvie Michel
Out in the Dark - Michael Mayer
Picture Day - Kate Mellville
Satellite Boy - Catriona McKenzie
La Sirga - William Vega
Tower - Kazik Radwanski
Wasteland - Rowan Athale

Short Cuts Canada
100 Musicians - Charles Officer
A Pretty Funny Story - Evan Morgan
American Sisyphus - Frieda Luk
Asian Gangs - Lewis Bennett and Calum MacLeod
Aubade (L'Aubade) - Carla Susanto
Bardo Light - Connor Gaston
Barefoot - Danis Goulet
Broken Heart Syndrome - Dusty Mancinelli
Bydlo - Patrick Bouchard
CanoeJacked - Jonathan Williams
Crackin' Down Hard - Mike Clattenburg
The Dancing Cop - Kelvin Redvers
Dear Scavengers - Aaron Phelan
Frost - Jeremy Ball
The Genius from Quintino - Johnny Ma
Herd Leader (Chef de meute) - Chloé Robichaud
H'Mong Sisters - Jeff Wong
Horrible Things (Les choses horrible) - Vincent Biron
How to Be Deadly - Nik Sexton
I'm Beginning to Miss You - Sakay Ottawa
Joda - Theodore Ushev
Keep a Modest Head (Ne crâne pas sois modeste) - Deco Dawson
Let the Daylight Into the Swamp - Jeffrey St. Jules
Life Doesn't Frighten Me - Stephen Dunn
Lingo - Bahar Noorizadeh
Lost in Motion - Ben Shirinian
Malody - Philip Barker
Model - Dylan Reibling
The Near Future (Le futur proche) - Sophie Goyette
Nostradamos - Maxence Bradley
Old Growth - Tess Girard
The Pool Date - Patrick Sisam
Reflexions - Martin Thibaudeau
Safe Room - Elizabeth Lazebnik
Shit Girls Say - Graydon Sheppard and Kyle Humphrey
Struggle (Faillir) - Sophie Dupuis
Sullivan's Applicant - Jeanne Leblanc
The Tape - Matt Austin
Their Feast (Waleematehom) - Reem Morsi
Tuesday - Fantavious Fritz
Vive la Canadienne - Joe Cobden
When You Sleep - Ashley McKenzie
With Jeff (Avec Jeff, à moto) - Marie-Ève Juste
The Worst Day Ever - Sophie Jarvis

Canada's Top Ten

Features
Cosmopolis, David Cronenberg
The End of Time, Peter Mettler
Goon, Michael Dowse
Laurence Anyways, Xavier Dolan
Midnight's Children, Deepa Mehta
My Awkward Sexual Adventure, Sean Garrity
War Witch (Rebelle), Kim Nguyen
Still Mine, Michael McGowan
Stories We Tell, Sarah Polley
The World Before Her, Nisha Pahuja

Short films
Bydlo, Patrick Bouchard
Crackin' Down Hard, Mike Clattenburg
Herd Leader (Chef de meute), Chloé Robichaud
Kaspar, Diane Obomsawin
Keep a Modest Head (Ne crâne pas sois modeste), Deco Dawson
Lingo, Bahar Noorizadeh
Malody, Phillip Barker
Old Growth, Tess Girard
Reflexions, Martin Thibaudeau
Wintergreen (Paparmane), Joëlle Desjardins Paquette

References

External links

 Official site
 Crowd Based Reviews of TIFF
 TIFF Reviews by an Indie Film Festival Director
 TIFF Reviews by Collider.com
 2012 Toronto International Film Festival at IMDb

2012
2012 film festivals
2012 in Toronto
2012 in Canadian cinema
2012 festivals in North America
September 2012 events in Canada